A Bronx Tale is an autobiographical one-man show written and performed by Chazz Palminteri. It tells the coming-of-age story of Calogero Anello, a young New Yorker torn between the temptations of organized crime and the values of his hardworking father. It originally premiered in Los Angeles in 1989, before moving Off-Broadway. A film version involving Palminteri and Robert DeNiro was released in 1993. In 2007, Palminteri performed his one-man show on Broadway and on tour.

A musical version, A Bronx Tale directed by Robert De Niro opened in 2016 at the Longacre Theatre on Broadway and played until December 2018.

Overview
A Bronx Tale tells the story of Calogero Anello, a young boy from a working class family who gets involved in the world of organized crime. Calogero's father is a bus driver who tries to instill working-class family values in his son. As Calogero gets older, the aura and mystique of the Mafia, and the charms of Sonny, the local mob boss who befriends Calogero (and ends up becoming a father figure to him), become difficult to resist. As Calogero comes of age, he must struggle with the choice of following his beloved father's values or submitting to the temptations of the life of organized crime.

Background and productions
Palminteri states that he began writing the play after being fired from a club when, as a doorman, he refused entry to super agent Swifty Lazar. The play is largely based on Palminteri's own childhood, specifically the shooting Calogero witnesses as a child, as well as the occupation and name of his father.

A Bronx Tale premiered at Theatre West in Los Angeles, achieving great critical success. Palminteri relates that "After some polishing, the show opened to positive reviews and soon attracted Hollywood interest. 'Every director, every studio head wanted to make the movie,' Palminteri said. 'They offered, $250,000, $500,000.'" Palminteri then appeared in the play Off-Broadway at Playhouse 91, from October 10, 1989, to December 24, 1989, directed by Mark X. Travis. The play had a sold-out run and Palminteri received a 1989–1990 Special Award from the Outer Critics Circle.

2007 Broadway 
In 2007, Palminteri performed his one-man show on Broadway. The Broadway production began previews on October 4, 2007, and opened on October 25, 2007, at the Walter Kerr Theatre. The show closed on February 24, 2008, after 108 performances and nineteen previews. It was directed by Jerry Zaks and Produced by Go Productions with Trent Othick being the lead producer,  with the set designed by Jim Noone, and the lighting designed by Paul Gallo. It recouped its capitalization and was followed by a national tour. The play was nominated for the 2007–2008 Outer Critics Circle Award for Outstanding Solo Performance.

Film adaptation
In 1990, at a performance of A Bronx Tale, Robert De Niro met with Palminteri in his dressing room after having seen the show. De Niro told Palminteri, "This is one of the greatest one-man shows I've ever seen, if not the greatest... This is a movie, this is an incredible movie." After acquiring the rights to create the film, with De Niro claiming the deal was made solely with a gentlemen's agreement with Palminteri, the duo began crafting the screenplay. Prior to partnering with De Niro, Palminteri rejected several offers for the film's rights, including some as high as $1 million, due to not being granted the roles of primary screenwriter and Sonny, the gangster Calogero meets. De Niro met Palminteri's requirements on the condition that he be allowed to direct the film and play Lorenzo, Calogero's father, which Palminteri accepted. The film of the same name was released in 1993.

Musical adaptation

After a ten-year development process, the original one man show was adapted into a new musical with a book by Chazz Palminteri, music by Alan Menken, and lyrics by Glenn Slater, and premiered at the Paper Mill Playhouse (Milburn, New Jersey) on February 4, 2016, before opening on Broadway December 1 later that year.

The musical is co-directed by Robert De Niro, who directed the original film, and Jerry Zaks, who directed the one man show on Broadway in 2007. The show also features choreography by Sergio Trujillo. Tommy Mottola serves as the production's leading producer.

The production includes sets by Beowulf Boritt, costumes by William Ivey Long, lighting by Howell Binkley, and sound by Gareth Owen. The cast features Bobby Conte Thornton  as Calogero, Nick Cordero as Sonny, Hudson Loverro as Young Calogero with Athan Sporek as his alternate, Richard H. Blake as Lorenzo, Ariana DeBose as Jane, and Lucia Giannetta as Rosina.

The musical began previews on Broadway on November 3, 2016, before officially opening on December 1, 2016 at the Longacre Theatre and closed on August 5, 2018 after 700 performances.

Sources 
Brennan, Sandra. "Chazz Palminteri Bio" AllMovie.com, accessed December 1, 2016

References

External links 

 Adams, Cindy. "A Bronx Tale To Remember", New York Post, 27 August 2007
 "A Bronx Tale To Open on Broadway", CBS News, 8 August 2007

1989 plays
Broadway plays
American plays adapted into films
Plays for one performer
Monodrama
Plays set in New York City
The Bronx in fiction